Gerit Kling (born 21 April 1965) is a German film, television and voice actress.

Life and work 
Kling grew up in Michendorf-Wilhelmshorst near Potsdam with her younger sister, actress Anja Kling. Her first acting role was in Konrad Wolf's Goya at the age of five. From 1982 she studied acting at the Ernst Busch Academy of Dramatic Arts in Berlin. After a string of engagements at the Deutsches Theater in Berlin, at the Theater Brandenburg and at the Mecklenburg State Theatre, she fled with her sister to West Germany shortly before the fall of the Berlin Wall. After the German reunification she played at the Staatstheater Nürnberg and the Theater am Kurfüstendamm in Berlin as well as in multiple TV shows, where she was often cast as a doctor. At the Störtebeker Festival she played the Duchess van Dooren in 2006.

In March 2008 she was on the cover of the German edition of Playboy.

Personal life 
Gerit Kling lives with her sister Anja Kling in Michendorf-Wilhelmshorst.

She separated from her husband Stefan Henning at the end of 2015 and divorced him in March 2016. In June 2016 she got engaged to Wolfram Becker whom she married on 9 November 2016.

Partial filmography

Movies 
 1972: Hund über Bord
 1988: Ich liebe dich – April! April!
 1989: 
 1989: 
 1989: Zwei schräge Vögel
 1990: Der Streit um des Esels Schatten
 1991: Go Trabi Go
 1992: Go Trabi Go 2 – Das war der wilde Osten
 2000: The Sea Wolf
 2000: Zurück auf Los!
 2006: Wo ist Fred?
 2013: Kaiserschmarrn

Television 
 1987: Der Staatsanwalt hat das Wort: Um jeden Preis (TV series episode)
 1988: Der Geisterseher
 1988–1990: Barfuß ins Bett (TV series, 14 episodes)
 1991: Polizeiruf 110: Todesfall im Park (TV series episode)
 1991: Luv und Lee (TV series, 7 episodes)
 1993–1994: Immer wieder Sonntag (TV series, 4 episodes)
 1994: Elbflorenz (TV series, 10 episodes)
 1994: Die Gerichtsreporterin (TV series, 13 episodes)
 1996: Wer hat Angst vorm Weihnachtsmann? (short)
 1997: Unser Charly (TV series, 4 episodes)
 1997–2000: Die Rettungsflieger (TV series, 31 episodes)
 1998: Das Traumschiff: Namibia (TV series episode)
 1999: Rosamunde Pilcher: Klippen der Liebe (TV series episode)
 2000: Für alle Fälle Stefanie: Stephanies Rückkehr (TV series episode)
 2001: Offroad.TV (TV series, 10 episodes)
 2001: In aller Freundschaft (TV series, 2 episodes)
 2002: Die Affäre Semmeling (TV miniseries)
 2002: Nicht ohne meinen Anwalt (TV series, 11 episodes)
 2002: Im Namen des Gesetzes: Tod am Telefon (TV series episode)
 2003: Polizeiruf 110: Doktorspiele (TV series episode)
 2003: Körner und Köter: Wie gewonnen, so zerronnen (TV series episode)
 2004: Der Ferienarzt in der Wachau (TV series episode)
 2005: Irren ist sexy
 2005–2006: Unter weißen Segeln (TV series, 3 episodes)
 2005: Hallo Robbie!: Das Marathonschwimmen (TV series episode)
 2006: M.E.T.R.O. – Ein Team auf Leben und Tod: Lassa (TV series episode)
 2006: Meine bezaubernde Feindin 2006: Da kommt Kalle: Familienbande (TV series episode)
 since 2007: Notruf Hafenkante (TV series, more than 300 episodes)
 2007: Die Masche mit der Liebe 2008: Kreuzfahrt ins Glück: Hawaii (TV series episode)
 2008: Unser Charly: Charly und das schwarze Schaf (TV series episode)
 2009: Am Kap der Liebe – Unter der Sonne Uruguays 2009: Alarm für Cobra 11 – Die Autobahnpolizei: Der Panther (TV series episode)
 2011: Das Traumschiff: Bora Bora (TV series episode)
 2011:  2016: Leipzig Homicide: Neues Leben (TV series episode)
 2017: Familie Dr. Kleist: Falsche Tatsachen (TV series episode)
 2019: Rote Rosen (TV series, 200 episodes)

German-language Dubbing
Natalie Brown (Kelly Goodweather), in The Strain (since 2014, TV series)

 Other works 
 2004: Unser großes Haus'' (children's book with CD)

References

External links
 
 Official homepage
Gerit Kling at the German Dubbing Card Index
 Gerit Kling at the Agentur Wendel
 Gerit Kling bei In aller Freundschaft at http://www.pressrelations.de/

German film actresses
German television actresses
German voice actresses
1965 births
Living people
21st-century German actresses